Vladimir Oravsky (born 22 January 1947 in Rožňava, Czechoslovakia) is a Swedish author and film director.

Before Oravsky decided to be a full-time writer, he made a living in Czechoslovakia as machine engineer and conveyor belt constructor. In Sweden, Denmark, Switzerland, Thailand and United States Oravsky survived as dishwasher, cleaner, newspaperman, dock worker, gold-washer, pea picker, tractor driver, cook, actor, photographer, translator, copywriter, literary critic, dramaturgist, lecturer, teacher, culture bureaucrat, such as culture manager for Umeå municipality, film- and theatre director and producer.

Oravsky is published by many publishing houses, as Studentlitteratur, h:ström – Text & Kultur, Nya Doxa, Symposion, Raketförlaget, Lundtofte Publishing, De Rode Kamer and Branner og Koch.
Oravsky has published books for children and youth, commissioned plays and screenplays. As his favorite model George S Kaufman, Oravsky works often in collaboration with writing partners, among them Kurt Peter Larsen, Daniel Malmen, Michael Segerström, Lars von Trier, Jakob Stegelman, and Natasa Durovicova.

Vladimir Oravsky and Kurt Peter Larsen are joint winners of 2006 International award for best play for children, organized by International Playwrights’ Forum, International Theatre Institute/ ITI and  ASSITEJ (International Association of Theatre for Children and Young People), for their contribution “AAAHR!!!”

“The Diary of Zlata Ibrahimivic” by Oravsky & Malmen was one of winning plays in competition, organized by Royal Drama Theatre / Elverket in Stockholm.

Books on film
 1983 - Film 1983 : årets bedste (Film 1983, the best of), co-author: J Stegelmann. .
 1984 - Film 1984 : film årbogen 1984 (Film Year book 1984), co-author: J Stegelmann. .
 1984 - I skuggornas hetta (In the Heat of Shadows), co-author: Olle Ekstrand, N Durovicova, Kerstin Sandström. .
 1985 - Ånden i biostaden (Soul of the Cinema), co-author: O Ekstrand, N Durovicova, Sven-Erik Svensson. .

Books for children and youth
 1988 - Öya, en flicka liten som ett busfrö (Öya, a Little Girl Devil), co-author: Elsa Thern. .
 1989 - Öya växer till sig, (Öya Grows up), co-author: E Thern. .
 1989 - Herman och Tusse (Herman and Tofsy), co-author: K P Larsen. .
 1989 - Herman och stjärnorna (Herman and the Stars), co-author: K P Larsen. .
 1989 - Harry - en bussig buss (Harry, a Kind Bus), co-author: K P Larsen. .
 2004 - Dumma byxa ut och gå när man nappar på en tå (Out, Silly Trousers!), .

Refugee trilogy
 2004 - Zlata Ibrahimovics dagbok (The Diary of Zlata Ibrahimovic), co-author: D Malmén. .
 2007 - Det rena landet : en berättelse om våldtäkt (The Immaculate Country : a Rape Story), co-author: D Malmén. .
 2007 - På väg : Berättelser av Zlata Ibrahimovic (On the Way: Stories by Zlata Ibrahimovic),  .

The Sweden-pentalogy
 2000 - Den lyckliga ockupationen (The Happy Occupation), 
 2002 - Lathund för ambitiösa katter. Del 1 : Metamorfoser enligt Ovidius, Kafka och Oravsky (Lazy dog for ambitious cats. Part 1 : Metamorphoses according to Ovid, Kafka and Oravsky), 
 2002 - Kulturen bakom kulturen (The Culture Behind the Culture), 
 2002 - Lathund för ambitiösa katter. Del 2 : Rhapsody in blue and yellow för blågula och rödgröna katters ett till flera in- och utandningsorgan (Lazy dog for ambitious cats. Part 2 : Rhapsody in blue and yellow for the several breathing organs of blueyellow and redgreen cats), 
 2007 - Friheten i kulturen : Reflexioner kring tystnad och repression inom kulturetablissemanget (Liberty within the culture : Thoughts on silence and repression within the cultural establishment)

Novels
 2006 - Van Astrid tot Lindgren (From Astrid to Lindgren), co-author: K.P. Larsen. 
 2007 - Axel och Toine (Axel and Toine)co-author: K.P. Larsen. 
 2007 - Från Astrid till Lindgren (From Astrid to Lindgren) co-author: K.P. Larsen & Anonymous.

Plays (published)
 - 2006 Flykten under jorden jämte flera gruvsamma och nöjsamma tragedier och komedier (The Underground Escape and Other Underhanded and Undermining Tragedies and Comedies). This volume consists of the following plays: Flykten under jorden (Escape Underground), Zlata Ibrahimovics dagbok (Diary of Zlata Ibrahimovic), Fioler, fikon och förebud (Fiddles, figs and fortitude),(Danish version: Blomkål og violinbuer = Cauliflower and fiddlesticks), Spartakus uppäten (Spartacus Devoured), (Danish version: Spartakus spist) and SKUM. co-author: K.P. Larsen & D. Malmén. 
 - 2006 ÄÄÄHR!!! (AAAHR!!!), (English language version), co-author: K.P. Larsen

External links
 National Library of Sweden
 h:ström – Text & Kultur
 International Playwrights' Forum

1947 births
Living people
Swedish-language writers
20th-century Swedish dramatists and playwrights
Swedish male dramatists and playwrights
20th-century Swedish novelists
20th-century Swedish male writers
21st-century Swedish dramatists and playwrights
21st-century Swedish novelists
21st-century Swedish male writers
Swedish male novelists
Slovak emigrants to Sweden
People from Rožňava